Ernst Wolfgang Hamburger  (8 June 1933 – 4 July 2018) was a German-born Brazilian physicist and popularizer of science. Hamburger was internationally known for his activities regarding public understanding of science. He was the director of Estação Ciência, an interactive science museum in São Paulo. He won the UNESCO Kalinga Prize for the Popularization of Science, the José Reis Award for the Divulgation of Science, the medal of the Brazilian Order of Scientific Merit, and was a member of the Brazilian Academy of Sciences.

Biography 
Born in Berlin on 8 June 1933, Hamburger fled from the Nazis with his parents to Brazil when he was three years old. He studied physics at the University of São Paulo and joined its faculty (Institute of Physics) soon after his graduation, in 1960, and retired  as a full professor of physics. Hamburger was married to Amélia I. Hamburger (d. 2011), also a physicist and colleague at the university. They had five children. One of them, Cao Hamburger, is a film and TV director and scriptwriter.

Hamburger died on 4 July 2018, in São Paulo, of lymphoma, at the age of 85.

References

1933 births
2018 deaths
Brazilian Jews
Brazilian physicists
People from Berlin
Jewish emigrants from Nazi Germany to Brazil
Academic staff of the University of São Paulo
University of São Paulo alumni
Commanders of the National Order of Scientific Merit (Brazil)
Members of the Brazilian Academy of Sciences
German emigrants to Brazil
Science communicators
Kalinga Prize recipients